is the 15th single by Japanese entertainer Akina Nakamori. Written by Ikki Matsumoto and Wataru Kuniyasu, the single was released on May 26, 1986, by Warner Pioneer through the Reprise label. It was also the second single from her third compilation album CD'87.

The single became Nakamori's 12th No. 1 on Oricon's weekly singles chart and sold over 357,600 copies.

Track listing

Charts

Cover versions 
 Composer Wataru Kuniyasu self-covered the song on his 1988 compilation album Wataru Kuniyasu's Best Hits.
 Yuki Murakami covered the song on her 2014 album Piano Woman: Tomodachi kara.

References

External links 
 
 
 

1986 singles
1986 songs
Akina Nakamori songs
Japanese-language songs
Warner Music Japan singles
Reprise Records singles
Oricon Weekly number-one singles